The 2015–16 season was Pafos's first season in the Cypriot First Division and second season in existence. They finished the League season in 14th position, and where relegated back to the Cypriot Second Division. Whilst in the Cypriot Cup they reached the Quarterfinals where they were defeated by Omonia, 8–0 on aggregate.

Season review
On 25 May 2015, Pafos announced that Nassir Maachi had signed from Birkirkara for the upcoming season, whilst Carlos Marques joined from Doxa Katokopias on 29 May 2015.

On 10 June, Pafos announced the signing of Hugues Ayivi from Vendée Poiré-sur-Vie. The following day, 11 June, Pafos announced that signing of Nikoloz Gelashvili and Jānis Krūmiņš.

On 3 July, Pafos announced then signing of Rasheed Alabi for the upcoming season.

On 7 July, Pafos announced then signing of Emmanuel Okoye.

On 9 July, Pafos announced the signing of Elgujja Grigalashvili for the upcoming season, whilst fellow Georgian Gia Grigalava signed a one-year contract two days later on 11 July.

On 30 December, Pafos announced then signing of Miguel Alba from Guaraní on a contract until the end of the season.

On 7 January, Jordi Codina joined Pafos on loan for the remainder of the season from APOEL. Whilst Éric Matoukou also joined in January from Inter Turku, signing a contract with Pafos until the end of the season.

Squad

Transfers

In

Loans in

Out

Released

Competitions

Overview

Cyta Championship

Regular season

League table

Results summary

Results

Relegation round

League table

Results summary

Results

Cypriot Cup

Squad statistics

Appearances and goals

|-
|colspan="14"|Players away on loan:
|-
|colspan="14"|Players who appeared for Pafos but left during the season:

|}

Goal scorers

Clean sheets

Disciplinary record

References

Pafos FC seasons
Pafos FC season